For other people named John Platt, see John Platt.

John Rader Platt (June 29, 1918 – June 17, 1992) was an American physicist and biophysicist, professor at the University of Chicago, noted for his pioneering work on strong inference in the 1960s and his analysis of social science in the 1970s.

Platt was born in Jacksonville, Florida. He received a B.A. from Northwestern University in 1936, and a PhD in physics from the University of Michigan in 1941. From 1945 to 1965 he was assistant professor at the University of Chicago. In the 1940s he supervised the lab work of Benjamin Drake Wright. He also taught at the Marine Biological Laboratory and at Stanford Medical School.

From 1965 to 1977 he was professor of physics at the University of Michigan and associate director of the Mental Health Research Institute. He was also visiting professor at Harvard, M.I.T., the Hebrew University of Jerusalem and at the Salk Institute for Biological Studies.

His research interests since the 1940s were in the field of molecular biophysics and biophysics, and in the 1960s shifted to philosophy of science, vision and perception, and social trends . In the 1970s he participated in the Club of Rome. He died in Boston.

Publications

Articles

Books 
 1962. The Excitement of Science. Houghton Mifflin. 
 1966. The Step to Man. John Wiley & Sons. 
 1970. Perception and Change: Projections for the Future 
 1972. On Social Transformation.

References 

1918 births
1992 deaths
20th-century American physicists
American biophysicists
American systems scientists
Wayne State University faculty
Northwestern University alumni
University of Michigan alumni
University of Chicago faculty
University of Michigan faculty
People from Jacksonville, Florida